David Dye may refer to:

 David William Dye (1887–1932), English physicist
 Dave Dye (born 1945), American football player
 David Dye (broadcaster), American radio broadcaster
 David Dye (metallurgist), British metallurgist

See also
David Dyer (disambiguation)